Skull and Bones, a secret society at Yale University, was founded in 1832. Until 1971, the organization published annual membership rosters, which were kept at Yale's library. In this list of notable Bonesmen, the number in parentheses represents the cohort year of Skull and Bones, as well as their graduation year.

There are no official rosters published after 1982 and membership for later years is speculative. Some news organizations refer to them as a power elite.

Founding members (1832–33 academic year)

Frederick Ellsworth Mather (1833), Democratic member of the New York State Assembly (1854–1857)
Phineas Timothy Miller (1833), American physician
William Huntington Russell (1833), Connecticut State Legislator, Major General
Alphonso Taft (1833), U.S. Attorney General (1876–1877), Secretary of War (1876), Ambassador to Austria-Hungary (1882) and Russia (1884–1885), father of William Howard Taft
George Ingersoll Wood (1833), American clergyman

19th century

1830s
Asahel Hooker Lewis (1833), newspaper editor and member of the Ohio General Assembly
John Wallace Houston (1834), Secretary of State of Delaware (1841–1844), associate judge Delaware Superior Court (1855–1893)
John Hubbard Tweedy (1834), delegate to the United States Congress from Wisconsin Territory (1847–1848)
William Henry Washington (1834), Whig U.S. Congressman from North Carolina (1841–1843)
John Edward Seeley (1835), US Representative from New York
Thomas Anthony Thacher (1835), Professor of Latin at Yale University (1842–1886)
Henry Champion Deming (1836), U.S. Representative from Connecticut
William Maxwell Evarts (1837), U.S. Secretary of State, Attorney General, Senator, grandson of Roger Sherman
Chester Smith Lyman (1837), astronomer, Yale professor of Industrial Mechanics and Physics
Allen Ferdinand Owen (1837), US Representative from Georgia
Benjamin Silliman, Jr. (1837), Yale professor of chemistry
Morrison Remmick Waite (1837), Chief Justice of the U.S. Supreme Court
Joseph B. Varnum, Jr. (1838), Speaker of the New York State Assembly
Richard Dudley Hubbard (1839), Governor of Connecticut, US Representative

1840s

James Mason Hoppin (1840), Professor emeritus at Yale
John Perkins, Jr. (1840), U.S. Representative from Louisiana, and then a senator in the Confederate States Congress
William Taylor Sullivan Barry (1841), U.S. Representative from Mississippi
John Andrew Peters (1842), US Representative from Maine
Benjamin Tucker Eames (1843), US Representative from Rhode Island
Roswell Hart (1843), US Representative from New York
Henry Stevens (1843), bibliographer
Orris Sanford Ferry (1844), US Senator from Connecticut, US Representative, US Brigadier General
William Barrett Washburn (1844), US Senator, Governor of Massachusetts.
Constantine Canaris Esty (1845), US Representative from Massachusetts
Richard Taylor (1845), Confederate General, Louisiana State Senator
Leonard Eugene Wales (1845), US District Court judge
Henry Baldwin Harrison (1846), Governor of Connecticut
Stephen Wright Kellogg (1846), US Representative from Connecticut
Rensselaer Russell Nelson (1846), US District Court judge
John Donnell Smith (1847), botanical researcher, Captain in the Confederate Army
Dwight Foster (1848), Massachusetts Attorney General (1861–64), and a justice of the Massachusetts Supreme Judicial Court (1866–69)
Augustus Brandegee (1849), US Representative from Connecticut.
Timothy Dwight V (1849), Yale President (1886–1899)
Francis Miles Finch (1849), New York Court of Appeals judge, Cornell University professor

1850s

Ellis Henry Roberts (1850), US Representative from New York
Richard Jacobs Haldeman (1851), Democratic member of the US House of Representatives from Pennsylvania
William Wallace Crapo (1852), US Representative from Massachusetts
Daniel Coit Gilman (1852), president of the University of California, Johns Hopkins University, and the Carnegie Institution, founder of the Russell Trust Association
George Griswold Sill (1852), Lieutenant Governor of Connecticut
Andrew Dickson White (1853), cofounder and first President of Cornell University
Carroll Cutler (1854), President of Western Reserve College, now known as Case Western Reserve University. 
Luzon Buritt Morris (1854), Governor of Connecticut
William DeWitt Alexander (1855), educator, linguist, and surveyor of Hawaii
Chauncey Depew (1856), Vanderbilt railroad attorney, US Senator
Eli Whitney Blake, Jr. (1857), American scientist and educator, great-nephew of Eli Whitney
John Thomas Croxton (1857), Civil War Brigadier General, United States Ambassador to Bolivia
Moses Coit Tyler (1857), professor of history at Cornell University
Burton Norvell Harrison (1859), private secretary to Jefferson Davis
Eugene Schuyler (1859), US Ambassador, author and translator

1860s
Lowndes Henry Davis (1860), US Representative from Missouri
William Walter Phelps (1860), US Representative from New Jersey
Simeon Eben Baldwin (1861), Governor and Chief Justice of the State of Connecticut, son of Roger Sherman Baldwin
Anthony Higgins (1861), US Senator
Edward Rowland Sill (1861), poet, professor at the University of California
Daniel Henry Chamberlain (1862), Governor of South Carolina
Franklin MacVeagh (1862), US Secretary of the Treasury
Henry Farnum Dimock (1863), Whitney family attorney, Director of the Yale Corporation
William Collins Whitney (1863), US Secretary of the Navy<ref>The University Magazine, vol. 5 no. 5, November 1891</ref>
Charles Fraser MacLean (1864), New York Supreme Court judge
John William Sterling (1864), lawyer, co-founder Shearman & Sterling
John Manning Hall (1866), lawyer, politician, and railroad executive
George Chandler Holt (1866), US District Court Judge
Henry Morton Dexter (1867), clergyman, editor, author
Albert Elijah Dunning (1867), American theologian and author
Thomas Hedge (1867), US Representative from Iowa
George Peabody Wetmore (1867), US Senator and Governor of Rhode Island
Chauncey Bunce Brewster (1868), Bishop of the Episcopal Diocese of Connecticut
LeBaron Bradford Colt (1868), US Senator and Circuit Court Judge
Wilson Shannon Bissell (1869), Postmaster General

1870s

William H. Welch (1870), Dean of Johns Hopkins University
Frederick Collin (1871), judge, mayor of Elmira, New York
Edwin Forrest Sweet (1871), US Representative from Michigan
Thomas Thacher (1871), lawyer
William Kneeland Townsend (1871), US Appeals Court judge
George Foot Moore (1872), author, Professor of theology at Harvard University
Theodore Salisbury Woolsey (1872), co-founder of the Yale Review, professor of international law
Eben Alexander (1873), American scholar, educator, dean and ambassador
Samuel Oscar Prentice (1873), Chief Justice of the Supreme Court of Connecticut
Frank Bigelow Tarbell (1873), classicist, professor of Greek and history at Yale, Harvard, and the University of Chicago
 Edward Rudolph Johnes (1873), Attorney and Author
Almet Francis Jenks (1875), Justice of the New York Supreme Court
John Patton, Jr. (1875), US Senator
Edward Curtis Smith (1875), Governor of Vermont
Walker Blaine (1876), United States Department of State official
Charles Newell Fowler (1876), US Representative from New Jersey
Arthur Twining Hadley (1876), Yale President 1899–1921
Roger Sherman Baldwin Foster (1878), lawyer and author
Tudor Storrs Jenks (1878), author
William Howard Taft (1878), 27th President of the United States, Chief Justice of the United States, Secretary of War
Edward Baldwin Whitney (1878), New York Supreme Court justice
Lloyd Wheaton Bowers (1879), Solicitor General of the United States
Ambrose Tighe (1879), member Minnesota House of Representatives
Timothy Lester Woodruff (1879), Lieutenant Governor of New York

1880s

Walter Camp (1880), father of American football and exercise proponent
Sidney Catlin Partridge (1880) Bishop of Kyoto, Japan, Bishop of the Episcopal Diocese of West Missouri
Henry Waters Taft (1880), lawyer, Cadwalader, Wickersham & Taft
Edwin Edgerton Aiken (1881), missionary
Thomas Burr Osborne (1881), chemist, co-discoverer of Vitamin A
Benjamin Brewster (1882), Bishop of Maine and Missionary Bishop of Western Colorado
William Phelps Eno (1882), traffic planner called the "Father of Traffic Safety"
James Campbell (1882), son of businessman Robert Campbell, Harvard Law 1888.
Elihu Brintnal Frost (1883), lawyer, president of several early submarine companies
Eliakim Hastings Moore (1883), mathematician, namesake of the Moore–Penrose pseudoinverse
Joseph Robinson Parrott (1883), president of the Florida East Coast Railway
Horace Dutton Taft (1883), educator, founder of the Taft School
Wilbur Franklin Booth (1884), US federal judge
Maxwell Evarts (1884), member of the Vermont House of Representatives, attorney for E. H. Harriman
Frank Bosworth Brandegee (1885), US Representative and Senator
Alfred Cowles, Jr. (1886), lawyer, director Chicago TribuneEdward Johnson Phelps (1886), president of Northern Trust Safe Deposit Company
Clinton Larue Hare (1887), lawyer, college football coach
George Griswold Haven, Jr. (1887), businessman
Oliver Gould Jennings (1887), financier, member of Connecticut House of Representatives
William Kent (1887), United States Congressman for California
Irving Fisher (1888), economist and eugenicist
Richard Melancthon Hurd (1888), real estate executive
Amos Alonzo Stagg (1888), college football Hall of Fame coach
Charles Otis Gill (1888), clergyman, author, college football coach
Henry L. Stimson (1888), Governor-General of the Philippines, US Secretary of War, US Secretary of State
Gifford Pinchot (1889), First Chief of U.S. Forest Service
George Washington Woodruff (1889), College Hall of Fame football coach, Acting Secretary of the Interior and Pennsylvania Attorney General

1890s
 Thomas F. Bayard, Jr. (1890), US Senator
Fairfax Harrison (1890), president Southern Railway Company
 Percy Hamilton Stewart (1890), US Representative from New Jersey
Frederic Collin Walcott (1891), US Senator
Hugh Aiken Bayne (1892), lawyer Strong & Cadwalader, Adjutant General's Office and War Department during World War I
Howell Cheney (1892), manufacturer, founded Howell Cheney Technical High School
Benjamin Lewis Crosby, Jr. (1892), law student and football coach
Clive Day (1892), Professor of economic history at Yale
Henry S. Graves (1892), co-founder and first Dean of Yale School of Forestry, 2nd chief of the U.S. Forest Service, founding member and 4th president of the Society of American Foresters
 James William Husted, Jr. (1892), US Representative
Pierre Jay (1892), first chairman of the Federal Reserve Bank of New York
Thomas Lee McClung (1892), Treasurer of the United States, College Football Hall of Fame player
Edson Fessenden Gallaudet (1893), aviation pioneer
Thomas Cochran (1894), partner in J.P. Morgan & Company
John Howland (1894), pediatrician at the Johns Hopkins Hospital
Ralph Delahaye Paine (1894), journalist and author
Harry Payne Whitney (1894), investment banker, husband of Gertrude Vanderbilt Whitney
Frank Seiler Butterworth (1895), member Connecticut State Senate, All-American football player and coach
 Francis Burton Harrison (1895), US Representative from New York, Governor-General of the Philippines
 Frank Augustus Hinkey (1895), zinc smelting business, College Football Hall of Fame player and coach
 Jules Henri de Sibour (1896), architect
Anson Phelps Stokes (1896), clergyman and Secretary of Yale University (1899–1921)
Samuel Brinckerhoff Thorne (1896), mining engineer and executive, College Football Hall of Fame
 Henry Sloane Coffin (1897), president of the Union Theological Seminary
Clarence Mann Fincke (1897), All-America football player
Amos Richards Eno Pinchot (1897), Progressive leader
James Wolcott Wadsworth Jr. (1898), U.S. Senator from New York
William Payne Whitney (1898), Whitney family businessman and philanthropist
 Frederick H. Brooke (1899), architect from Washington, D.C.
 James McDevitt Magee (1899), US Representative from Pennsylvania
Alfred Gwynne Vanderbilt (1899), member of the Vanderbilt family

20th century

1900s
Frederick Baldwin Adams (1900), railroad executive
Ashley Day Leavitt (1900), Congregational minister, Harvard Congregational Church, Brookline, Massachusetts, frequent lecturer and public speaker
Percy Rockefeller (1900), director of Brown Brothers Harriman, Standard Oil, and Remington Arms
Charles Edward Adams (1904), director of the Federal Reserve Bank of New York
Russell Cheney (1904), American painter and noted portrait artist.
Thomas Day Thacher (1904), US District Court judge, Solicitor General
John Gillespie Magee (1906), Yale Chaplain, documenter of the Rape of Nanking
Foster Rockwell (1906), All-America football player and coach
William McCormick Blair (1907), American financier, heir to the McCormick reaper fortune
Hugh Smith Knox (1907), All-America football player
Samuel Finley Brown Morse (1907), developer and conservationist, All-America football player
Lucius Horatio Biglow (1908), All-America football player and coach
Charles Seymour (1908), President of Yale (1937–1951), founding member of The Council on Foreign Relations
Harold Stanley (1908), co-founder of Morgan Stanley
Harvey Hollister Bundy (1909), Assistant Secretary of State (1931–1933)
Allen Trafford Klots (1909), New York City lawyer and president of the New York City Bar Association, partner at Winthrop & Stimson

1910s

Edward Harris Coy (1910), College Football Hall of Fame player
Albert DeSilver (1910), co-founder American Civil Liberties Union
George Leslie Harrison (1910), President of the Federal Reserve Bank of New York
Stephen Philbin (1910), All-American football player, lawyer
Robert Alphonso Taft (1910), US Senator from Ohio
Robert Abbe Gardner (1912), two-time U.S. Amateur-winning golfer
Gerald Clery Murphy (1912), painter
Alfred Cowles III (1913), economist, founder of the Cowles Commission
Averell Harriman (1913), businessman, founding partner in Harriman Brothers & Company and later Brown Brothers Harriman & Co., U.S. Ambassador and Secretary of Commerce, Governor of New York, Chairman and CEO of the Union Pacific Railroad, Brown Brothers & Harriman, and the Southern Pacific Railroad
Henry Holman Ketcham (1914), College Football Hall of Fame
Edwin Arthur Burtt (1915), philosopher
Archibald MacLeish (1915), poet and diplomat
Wesley Marion Oler, Jr. (1916), American baseball player and track and field athlete, competed in the 1912 Summer Olympics
Howard Phelps Putnam (1916), poet
Donald Ogden Stewart (1916), author and screenwriter, Academy Award-winner for The Philadelphia StoryPrescott Bush (1917), founding partner in Brown Brothers Harriman & Co., US Senator from Connecticut. His nickname was "The Japanese".
E. Roland Harriman (1917), co-founder Harriman Brothers & Company
Harry William LeGore (1917), All-America college football player
H. Neil Mallon (1917), CEO of Dresser Industries
Kenneth Farrand Simpson (1917), member of the United States House of Representatives from New York
 Howard Malcolm Baldrige (1918), US Representative from Nebraska
F. Trubee Davison (1918), WWI aviator, Assistant US Secretary of War, New York State Representative, Director of Personnel at the CIA
John Chipman Farrar (1918), publisher, founder of Farrar & Rinehart and Farrar, Straus and Giroux
 Artemus Lamb Gates (1918), businessman, US Assistant Secretary of the Navy for Air
Robert A. Lovett (1918), US Secretary of Defense
Charles Phelps Taft II (1918), son of President William Howard Taft, Mayor of Cincinnati, Ohio
John Martin Vorys (1918), US Representative from Ohio

1920s
Lewis Greenleaf Adams (1920), architect
Briton Hadden (1920), co-founder of Time-Life Enterprises
Francis Thayer Hobson (1920), chair of William Morrow
David Sinton Ingalls (1920), WWI Navy Flying Ace, Ohio State Representative, Assistant Secretary of the Navy
Henry Luce (1920), co-founder of Time-Life Enterprises
Charles Harvey Bradley, Jr. (1921), businessman
Juan Terry Trippe (1921), Founder Pan American Airways
Stanley Woodward (1922), US Foreign Service officer, State Department Chief of Protocol, US Ambassador to Canada
John Sherman Cooper (1923), US Senator from Kentucky
Russell Davenport (1923), editor of Fortune magazine; created Fortune 500 list
F. O. Matthiessen (1923), historian, literary critic
Edwin Foster Blair (1924), lawyer
Walter Edwards Houghton (1924), historian of Victorian literature, compiler of The Wellesley Index to Victorian Periodicals, 1824–1900Charles Merville Spofford (1924), lawyer and NATO official
John Allen Miner Thomas (1924), author
Marvin Allen Stevens (1925), orthopedic surgeon, College Football Hall of Fame player and coach
James Jeremiah Wadsworth (1927), diplomat, US Ambassador to the UN
George Herbert Walker, Jr. (1927), financier and co-founder of the New York Mets; uncle to President George Herbert Walker Bush
John Rockefeller Prentice (1928), lawyer and cattle breeder
Lanny Ross (1928), singer.
Granger Kent Costikyan (1929), partner Brown Brothers Harriman
George Crile, Jr. (1929), surgeon
Ralph Delahaye Paine, Jr. (1929), editor and publisher (Fortune)

1930s
Charles Alderson Janeway (1930), Professor of Pediatrics at Harvard Medical School
H. J. Heinz II (1931), heir to H. J. Heinz Company; father of H. John Heinz III
Lewis Abbot Lapham (1931), banking and shipping executive
John M. Walker (1931), physician, investment banker
Frederick Baldwin Adams Jr. (1932), bibliophile, director of the Pierpont Morgan Library
Samuel Hazard Gillespie Jr. (1932), U.S. Attorney for the Southern District of New York, senior counsel at Davis Polk & Wardwell
Tex McCrary (1932), journalist, public relations and political strategist to President Eisenhower
Eugene O'Neill Jr. (1932), professor of Greek literature, son of Eugene O'Neill
Francis Judd Cooke (1933), composer
Samuel Carnes Collier (1935), advertising, racecar driver
Lyman Spitzer (1935), theoretical physicist and namesake of the NASA Spitzer Space Telescope
Sonny Tufts (1935), actor
Jonathan Brewster Bingham (1936), U.S. Representative (D-New York)
Brendan Gill (1936), author and New Yorker contributor
John Hersey (1936), author
John Merrill Knapp (1936), musicologist, professor at Princeton University
William H. Orrick Jr. (1937), United States federal judge, brother of Andrew Downey Orrick
Potter Stewart (1937), U.S. Supreme Court Justice
J. Richardson Dilworth (1938), Rockefeller family lawyer
Clinton Frank (1938), advertising, College Football Hall of Fame and Heisman Trophy-winning player
Albert Hessberg II (1938), lawyer, first Jewish member of Skull and Bones
William P. Bundy (1939), State Department liaison for the Bay of Pigs invasion, brother of McGeorge Bundy
William Welch Kellogg (1939), climatologist, associate director National Center for Atmospheric Research

1940s
McGeorge Bundy (1940), Special Assistant for National Security Affairs; National Security Advisor; Professor of History, brother of William Bundy
Andrew Downey Orrick (1940), acting chairman of the Securities and Exchange Commission
Barry Zorthian (1941), American diplomat, most notably press officer in Saigon for  years during Vietnam WarOral history , conducted by Richard B. Verrone, Ph.D., The Vietnam Archive at Texas Tech University, 2006. Pp 27–8. Retrieved 2011-02-11.
David Acheson (1943), author, lawyer, son of Dean Acheson
Harold Harris Healy, Jr. (1943), lawyer, partner Debevoise & Plimpton
James L. Buckley (1944), U.S. Senator (R-New York 1971–1977) and brother of William F. Buckley, Jr.Bob Dart, "Skull and bones a secret shared by Bush, Kerry", The Gazette, March 7, 2004
John Bannister Goodenough (1944), solid-state physicist at the University of Texas at Austin and winner of the 2019 Nobel Prize in Chemistry
Townsend Walter Hoopes II (1944), historian, Under Secretary of the Air Force (1967–69)
William Singer Moorhead (1944), US Representative from Pennsylvania
James Whitmore (1944), actor
John Chafee (1947), U.S. Senator, Secretary of the Navy and Governor of Rhode Island, father of Lincoln Chafee
Josiah Augustus Spaulding (1947), lawyer, partner Bingham Dana & Gould
Charles S. Whitehouse (1947), CIA Agent (1947–1956), U.S. Ambassador to Laos and Thailand in the 1970s.
Thomas William Ludlow Ashley (1948), US Representative from Ohio
George H. W. Bush (1948), 41st President of the United States, 11th Director of Central Intelligence (CIA), son of Prescott Bush, father of George W. Bush. His Skull and Bones nickname was "Magog".
 William Sloane Coffin (1949), CIA agent (1950–1953), clergyman and peace activist
Daniel Pomeroy Davison (1949), banker, president United States Trust Corporation
 Tony Lavelli (1949), basketball player
 David McCord Lippincott (1949), novelist and composer
 Charles Edwin Lord II (1949), banker, Vice-Chairman of the Export-Import Bank of the United States

1950s
William F. Buckley, Jr. (1950), founder of National Review, former CIA officer
William Henry Draper III (1950), Chair of United Nations Development Programme and Export-Import Bank of the United States
Evan G. Galbraith (1950), US Ambassador to France; managing director of Morgan Stanley
Thomas Henry Guinzburg (1950), president Viking Press
Victor William Henningsen, Jr. (1950), president Henningsen Foods Inc.
Raymond Price (1951), speechwriter for Presidents Nixon, Ford, and Bush.
Fergus Reid Buckley (1952), author and public speaker
Charles Sherman Haight, Jr. (1952), Connecticut District Court judge
Jonathan James Bush (1953), banker, son of Prescott Bush
William H. Donaldson (1953), appointed chairman of the U.S. Securities and Exchange Commission by George W. Bush; founding dean of Yale School of Management; co-founder of Donaldson, Lufkin & Jenrette investment firm
John Birnie Marshall (1953), Olympic medal-winning swimmer
James Price McLane (1953), Olympic medal-winning swimmer
George Herbert Walker III (1953), US Ambassador to Hungary
David McCullough (1955), U.S. historian; two-time Pulitzer Prize winner
Caldwell Blakeman Esselstyn, Jr. (1956), Olympic medal-winning rower, physician, author
Jack Edwin McGregor (1956), Pennsylvania State Senator, founder Pittsburgh Penguins
R. Inslee Clark, Jr. (1957), former Director of Undergraduate Admissions for Yale College; former Headmaster of Horace Mann School
Linden Stanley Blue (1958), aviation executive
Robert Willis Morey, Jr. (1958), Olympic medal-winning rower
Stephen Adams (1959), American businessman, founder Adams Outdoor
Winston Lord (1959), Chairman of Council on Foreign Relations; Ambassador to China; Assistant U.S. Secretary of State

1960s

Eugene Lytton Scott (1960), tennis player, founder Tennis WeekMichael Johnson Pyle (1960), National Football League player
John Joseph Walsh, Jr. (1961), art historian, director J. Paul Getty Museum
William Hamilton (1962), New Yorker cartoonist
David L. Boren (1963), Governor of Oklahoma, U.S. Senator, President of the University of Oklahoma
Michael Gates Gill (1963), advertising executive, author
William Dawbney Nordhaus (1963), Sterling Professor of Economics at Yale University and winner of the 2018 Nobel Prize in Economics
Orde Musgrave Coombs (1965), author, editor, first black member of Skull and Bones
John Shattuck (1965), US diplomat and ambassador, university administrator
John Forbes Kerry (1966), 68th United States Secretary of State (2013–2017); U.S. Senator (D-Massachusetts; 1985-2013);  Lieutenant Governor of Massachusetts (1983–1985); 2004 Democratic Party Presidential nominee;
David Rumsey (1966), founder of the David Rumsey Map Collection and president of Cartography Associates
Frederick Wallace Smith (1966), founder of FedEx
David Thorne (1966), United States Ambassador to Italy
Victor Ashe (1967), Tennessee State Senator and Representative, Mayor of Knoxville, Tennessee, US Ambassador to Poland
Roy Leslie Austin (1968), appointed ambassador to Trinidad and Tobago by George W. Bush
George W. Bush (1968), grandson of Prescott Bush; son of George H. W. Bush; 46th Governor of Texas; 43rd President of the United States. His nickname was "Fog".
Rex William Cowdry (1968), Acting Director National Institute of Mental Health (1994–96)
Robert McCallum, Jr (1968), Ambassador to Australia
Don Schollander (1968), developer; author; US Olympic Hall of Fame inductee; four-time Olympic Gold medallist swimmer
Brian John Dowling (1969), National Football League player, inspiration for B.D. in DoonesburyStephen Allen Schwarzman (1969), co-founder of The Blackstone GroupAndrew Clark, "The Guardian profile: Stephen Schwarzman", The Guardian, June 15, 2007
Douglas Preston Woodlock (1969), US federal judge

1970s
Charles Herbert Levin (1971), actor
George E. Lewis (1974), trombonist and composer
Christopher Taylor Buckley (1975), author, editor, chief speechwriter for Vice President George H. W. Bush
Robert Curtis Brown (1979), American Film, Television and Stage Actor

1980s
Robert William Kagan (1980), neoconservative writer
Michael Cerveris (1983), American actor, singer, and guitarist
Earl G. Graves, Jr. (1984), president of Black EnterpriseEdward S. Lampert (1984), founder of ESL Investments; chairman of Sears Holdings Corporation
James Emanuel Boasberg (1985), judge, United States District Court for the District of Columbia
Steven Mnuchin (1985), United States Treasury Secretary
James Bosquez (1988), political reporter for Vice. Dead Man's Jacket GuitaristDeborah itchell, "A Rich Bounty, Gone For Good", New York Daily News, January 28, 2001
Paul Giamatti (1989), American Actor and Producer; son of A. Bartlett Giamatti, President of Yale 1978-86

1990s to present
Dana Milbank (1990), author and columnist at The Washington Post
Austan Goolsbee (1991), staff director to and chief economist of President Barack Obama's Economic Recovery Advisory Board
David Leonhardt (1994), journalist and columnist at The New York Times
Angela Warnick Buchdahl (1994), senior rabbi at New York's Central Synagogue
Tali Farhadian Weinstein (1997), attorney, professor, and former candidate for New York County District Attorney 

References

Further reading
 Millegan, Kris, ed. Fleshing Out Skull and Bones: Investigations into America's Most Powerful Secret Society. Walterville, OR: Trine Day, 2003. 
 Sutton, Antony C. America's Secret Establishment: An Introduction to the Order of Skull & Bones''. Walterville, OR: Trine Day, 2003. 

Skull and Bones

Skull